Football in Korea may refer to:
Football in North Korea
Football in South Korea